Mayfair CIB Bank Limited, is a commercial bank in Kenya. It is licensed by the Central Bank of Kenya, the country's central bank and national banking regulator.

Location
The headquarters and main branch of the bank are located on the Mezzanine Floor at KAM House, along Mwanzi Road, in Westlands, Nairobi. The geographical location of the bank's headquarters are:01°15'28.0"S, 36°48'08.5"E (Latitude:-1.257778; Longitude:36.802361).

Overview
Mayfair CIB Bank is a retail banking institution, serving small to medium enterprises, large corporate clients and individuals. The bank was started in 2017, as a greenfield investment, by 31 Kenyan investors. As of December 2019, the bank's total assets were valued at KSh8.65 billion (US$82 million), with shareholders' equity of KSh1.040 billion (US$10 million).

History
Mayfair CIB Bank was granted a banking licence by the CBK on 20 June 2017 and began its operations on 1 August 2017.

In December 2019, Commercial International Bank, based in Egypt began the process of seeking regulatory approval in Egypt and Kenya, to acquire a controlling interest in Mayfair Bank.

Shareholding
As of June 2017, the bank was locally owned by 31 shareholders, thirteen of them corporate and eighteen individuals. At that time, the ownership of the bank's stock, is as illustrated in the table below:

In April 2020, Commercial International Bank of Egypt bought 51 percent shareholding in Mayfair bank for a consideration of US$35 million. The shareholding in the bank changed as illustrated in the table below.

Branches
As of December 2019, Mayfair CIB Bank maintained five networked branches at the following locations:

 Westlands Branch: Ground Floor, KAM House, Mwanzi Road (Opposite Westgate Mall), Westlands, Nairobi.Main Branch
 Upper Hill Branch: Ground Floor, Mayfair Centre, Ralph Bunche Road, Upper Hill, Nairobi.
 Industrial Area Branch: Hi-Tech Granite Industries Building, Enterprise Road, Nairobi.
 Mombasa Branch: Ground Floor, Krish Plaza, Links Road (Adjacent to Links Plaza), Mkomani, Nyali, Mombasa.
 Eldoret Branch: Second Floor, Rupa's Mall, Malaba Road, Eldoret.

Governance 
Mayfair CIB Bank is governed by a ten-person Board of Directors with Tom Gitogo serving as the Chairman and Hossam Rageh as the CEO.

Acquisition 
On the 3rd of December 2019, it was announced that one of Egypt’s top banks, Commercial International Bank (CIB) wanted to acquire Mayfair Bank. In April 2020, after receiving regulatory and shareholder approval from Nairobi and Cairo, CIB paid US$35 million in exchange for 51 percent shareholding in Mayfair Bank. The bank is in the process of rebranding to Mayfair CIB Bank Kenya Limited.

See also 

 List of banks in Kenya
 Central Bank of Kenya
 Economy of Kenya

References

External links
 Official website

Banks of Kenya
Banks established in 2017
Companies based in Nairobi
Kenyan companies established in 2017